Allach may refer to:

 Allach, a part of Allach-Untermenzing, a north-western borough of Munich
 Allach (porcelain)
 Allach (concentration camp)